Gravatal is a municipality in the state of Santa Catarina in the South region of Brazil.

Located in a mountainous area, Gravatal has been a center for relaxation and health treatment for many years. Due to the heated water, that flows out from the soil at 37 °C and it is divided and supplies four local hotels (Termas, Internacional, Cabanas and Termas do Lago) and an aquatic complex. The spring water contains chemicals such as fluorine and lithium.

Approximately 2,000 people live in the region of the city where the spas are located, then in July, the population expands so that up to 50 thousand tourists can visit the area.

The area has tourist walking trails, a lookout, waterfalls, and a religious grotto. There are adventure sports operators who organize outings for rappelling, mountain biking, rafting, canyoning, ziplining, canopy tours, and climbing. The mountain ramp of Morro Seco is also used for hang gliders. Other tourist highlights are the horse drawn carriage tours and the knitwear mills.

Other tourist sights, include the 'Church of São Sebastião'.
It was built in 1842 by Azoreans from the nearby city of Laguna, the building also received influence from the Italian immigrants (beginning in 1880) and German immigrants (beginning in 1910), with special mention of the altar, which is the work of German artist and teacher Hugo Berndt.

Culture
800 meters from the centre of the Gravatal, is 'Ecopark Termas' built to promote ideas for sustainable development and well-being. It is a sight with 17,000 m², within 7,500 m² of preserved forest RPPN (private natural heritage reserve), located on Rua Antônio Pedro Mendonça.

See also
List of municipalities in Santa Catarina

References

Municipalities in Santa Catarina (state)